The 1986 NCAA Division I Field Hockey Championship was the sixth women's collegiate field hockey tournament organized by the National Collegiate Athletic Association, to determine the top college field hockey team in the United States. The Iowa Hawkeyes won their first championship, defeating the New Hampshire Wildcats in the final. The championship rounds were held at Foreman Field in Norfolk, Virginia for the second straight year.

Bracket

References 

1986
Field Hockey
1986 in women's field hockey
1986 in sports in Virginia
Women's sports in Virginia